Chongoyape District is one of twenty districts of the province Chiclayo in Peru, located in the Department of Lambayeque, under the administration of the regional government of Lambayeque, Peru. The Tinajones reservoir and Carhuaquero hydroelectric center are nearby.

Etymology
The word Chongoyape comes from the Quechua language and means sad or crying heart.

History
The district capital of the district of Chongoyape is the city of Chongoyape, located to the east of the city of Chiclayo. It was founded on June 17, 1825, on land donated by the landowner Pedro José de las Muñecas, with the name of Santa Catalina de Chongoyape, in honor of the donor’s wife, Catalina Agüero.

Economy
The citizens of Chongoyape mostly work in agriculture, which highlights the planting of rice and sugar cane as well as corn.

Ecology

Wildlife
Among the wildlife that can be seen are the White-winged Guan, the spectacled bear, the Puna, the Ocelot, White Tail Deer, eagles of different spices, CaracCara, guanacos, llamas, condors and other endemic species. 
Around the Private Reserve Chaparri, the following birds, among others, can be seen: Brush-headed Duck, White-winged Guan, Tyrannulet Grey and White, White-tailed Magpie, Baird's Flycatcher, and Tumbes Sparrow.

Private Reserve Chaparri
This reserve, which was created in 2001, is located in the outside region of Chongoyape. Chaparrí Reserve was the first reserve to get support from the Department of Protected Areas of the National Institute of Human Resources (INRENA). Animals like the Pava Albiblanca and spectacled bear, who are endangered, are kept in captivity. 
Flora: 122 varieties of plants (103 genres and 45 botanical families). 
Fauna: 250 varieties of birds.
Also found in the Private Reserve Chaparri:
23 species of mammals
21 species of reptiles
4 species of amphibians
5 species of fish.
Thanks to the support of the rural community of Chongoyape and private enterprises this project is being carried out with good results.

Authorities

Government
2011-2014 
Mayor: Agustín Lozano Saavedra, from the political party Alianza Para el Progreso (APEP). 
Aldermen: Alden Padilla Díaz (APEP), Liliana Uriarte Delgado de Montenegro (APEP), María Ysabel Alvarez Huatay (APEP), Marlon Montalvo García (APEP), Reyna Mendoza Castro (APRA). 
2007-2010 
Mayor: Fernando Eamon Valera Abanto.

Tourist Attractions
Chongoyape is the birthplace of the famous song "La Chongoyapana" composed by professor and poet Arthur Schutt Saco. He was amazed at the beauty of Zoraida Leguía, who was the granddaughter of former Peru president Augusto B. Leguia. Saco wrote the song in 1902.

Hace algún tiempo que te enamoro,
Chongoyapana;
pero mi llanto, ni mis suspiros
tu pecho ablandan.
Como las piedras del racarumi
es dura tu alma

para este pobre que te ha venido
siguiendo, ingrata...
Sé que tus ojos abrasadores
miran con ansias.

al venturoso que te desdeña
y a quien tu amas.
Pero ¡no importa! Yo también tengo

quien me idolatre,
quien por mi pena, por mi suspira
y aun vierte lagrimas...
Tiene ojos verdes, cabellos rubios
y tez de nácar.

Y sus sonrisas son las canciones
de la esperanza.

Con que así mira no me desdeñes,
niña simpática;
porque aburrido tal vez me ahorque 
de tu ventana.

Y entonces el vulgo diría al verte,
cuando pasares;
Ahí va la niña de faz de cielo
cuyo amor mata.

Gastronomy
Chongoyape is also known for their sweetbreads. One of their special sweetbreads is called “Chongoyape”. Also, since Chongoyape belongs to the region of Lambayeque, they are known for a pastry called King Kong, made with the same old methods and provided by the Valera family (heirs of the great Eufemio Valera). Another dish of Chongoyape is known for is shurumbo, a soup made with green banana, cassava, beans and pork. This plate is traditional in Chongoyape.

References